Vasile Bizău (born October 14, 1969) is a Romanian bishop of the Greek-Catholic Church.

Biography 
He was born in Dragomirești, Maramureș County into a Greek-Catholic family that continued in the faith while the church was banned under the communist regime. 

He graduated from high school in Baia Mare in 1988 and studied theology there from 1990 to 1993. From 1993 to 2000 he studied at the Pontifical Gregorian University in Rome through the master's degree level, pursuing doctoral studies in the same city from 2001 to 2002. 

Ordained deacon in Giulești Commune in 1996, he became a priest the following year in Baia Mare. With his return to Romania in 2000, he became parish priest at two churches in Baia Mare, and started teaching at the Northern University. 

Elected bishop in 2007, he was proclaimed titular bishop of Appiaria by Pope Benedict XVI and consecrated at the Cathedral of the Holy Trinity in Blaj. 

In 2011, Archbishop Lucian Mureșan transferred Bizău to Baia Mare, where he became Bishop of Maramureș.

Notes

1969 births
Living people
People from Dragomirești, Maramureș
Romanian Greek-Catholic bishops
Pontifical Gregorian University alumni